This is a list of Turkish women writers who are Ottoman or Turkish nationals and who write in Turkish language.

A
Halide Edib Adıvar (1884–1964), novelist, nationalist, feminist
Adalet Ağaoğlu (1929–2020), prominent novelist, playwright, essayist, memoirist, short story writer
Süreyya Ağaoğlu (1903–1989), lawyer, non-fiction writer
Zeynep Ahunbay (born 1946), educator, works on preservation of cultural heritage
Gülten Akın (1933–2015), influential poet, playwright, works widely translated
Seza Kutlar Aksoy (born 1945), children's writer
Alev Alatlı (born 1944), best selling novelist, economist, columnist, playwright, translator 
Süreyya Aylin Antmen (born 1981), poet, essayist
Nezihe Araz (1920–2009), religious writer, journalist
Meltem Arıkan (born 1968), novelist, playwright, columnist
Ayşe Arman (born 1969), journalist, columnist
Duygu Asena (1946–2006), journalist, best selling non-fiction author on women's rights
Aydilge, full name Aydilge Sarp (born 1979), poet, songwriter, short story writer
Samiha Ayverdi (1905–1993), novelist, mystic

B
Oya Baydar (born 1940), sociologist, novelist
Nazan Bekiroğlu (born 1957), novelist, essayist
Seyla Benhabib (born 1950), Turkish-American philosopher, non-fiction writer, biographer
Üstün Bilgen-Reinart (born 1947), Turkish-born Canadian journalist, non-fiction writer
Sevim Burak (1931–1983), novelist, playwright, letter writer

C
Peride Celal (1916–2013), novelist, short story writer
Hasibe Çerko (born 1971), storyteller, philosopher
Fethiye Çetin (born 1950), lawyer, human rights activist, novelist
Muazzez İlmiye Çığ (born 1914), archaeologist, works on Sumerian and Middle-Eastern civilization
Zehra Çırak (born 1960), Turkish-born German poet, short story writer 
Nuriye Ulviye Mevlan Civelek (1893–1964) journalist and magazine owner
Alev Croutier (born c. 1945), Turkish-born American novelist, non-fiction writer, screenwriter

D
 Suat Derviş (1904 oder 1905–1972), Turkish female novelist, journalist, and political activist
Güzin Dino (1910–2013), non-fiction writer, translator of Turkish works into French
Nurduran Duman (born 1974), poet, essayist, translator

E
Aslı Erdoğan (born 1967), novelist, human rights activist, columnist, some works translated into English

F
Fitnat Hanım (18th century), early poet
Füruzan (born 1932), pen name of Füruzan Yerdelen (born 1932), short story writer, novelist, screenwriter

G
Nilüfer Göle (born 1953), sociologist, non-fiction writer
Aysel Gürel (1929–2008), lyricist, actress, author of many Turkish popular songs
Azmiye Hami Güven (1904–1954), novelist

K
Yadé Kara (born 1965), Turkish-born German-language novelist
Suzan Emine Kaube (born 1942), Turkish-born German-language novelist, poet
Rabia Kazan (born 1976), journalist, feminist, television host
Birhan Keskin (born 1963), poet
Ayşe Kulin (born 1941), popular novelist, short story writer, columnist, several works translated into English
İsmet Kür (1916–2013),  educator, journalist, columnist and writer of mainly children's literature

L
Nuray Lale (born 1962), novelist, translator

M
Perihan Mağden (born 1960), novelist, journalist, columnist, several works translated into English
Nilgün Marmara (1958–1987), poet, some poems translated into English
Nuray Mert (born 1960), journalist, educator, television presenter
Nezihe Muhiddin (1889–1958), journalist, novelist, politician, feminist
Lale Müldür (born 1956), influential poet, novelist, columnist

N
Nigâr Hanım (1856–1918), major poet, playwright, memoirist

O
Birgül Oğuz (born 1981), novelist
Meral Okay (1959–2012), actress, screenwriter
Sevin Okyay (born 1942), journalist, critic, novelist, translator
Emine Semiye Önasya (1864–1944), educator, textbook writer, novelist
Aysel Özakın (born 1942), novelist, short story writer, children's writer, writing in Turkish, German and English
Emine Sevgi Özdamar (born 1949), German-language playwright, short story writer, novelist
Tezer Özlü (1943–1986), novelist

P
Zeynep Sevde Paksu (born 1983), children's writer, publisher

S
Güzide Sabri Aygün 1886–1946), romance novelist
Elif Şafak (born 1971), acclaimed novelist, columnist, feminist
Pınar Selek (born 1971), sociologist, feminist, journalist, editor
Neslihan Şenocak (born c.1976), historian, writer, professor
Sabiha Sertel (1895–1968), early feminist journalist, essayist
Sevgi Soysal (1936–1976), novelist, short story writer, memoirist
Edibe Sözen (born 1961), sociologist, politician, writings on sociology

T
Suna Tanaltay (1933–2021), poet, writer,  psychologist
Sevim Tekeli (1924–2019), educator, works on astronomy, cartography
Latife Tekin (born 1957), influential feminist, novelist, playwright, memoirist
Ece Temelkuran (born 1973), journalist, columnist, novelist, television presenter
Arzu Toker (born 1952), journalist, anti-Islam activist, lives in the Netherlands 
Fatma Aliye Topuz (1862–1936), columnist, essayist, novelist, feminist
Ayfer Tunç (born 1964), novelist, short story writer, essayist

U
Bahriye Üçok (1919–1990), theologian, columnist, feminist
Buket Uzuner (born 1955), widely translated novelist, short story writer, travel writer

Z
Zafer Hanım (19th century), first Turkish novelist
Ayşe Nur Zarakolu (1946–2002), publisher, human rights advocate
Halide Nusret Zorlutuna (1901–1984), poet, novelist, short story writer, autobiographer

See also
List of women writers
Turkish women writers

References

External links
Women Writers of Turkey website with excellent English biographies
Turkish Women Writers in English Translation, article by Arzu Akbatur

-
Turkish
Writers
Writers, women